Wright City R-II School District is a school district headquartered in Wright City, Missouri. It serves all of Wright City, Innsbrook, Incline Village, parts of Foristell, and parts of southern Lincoln County,.

Schools

Wright City
 Wright City High School
 Wright City Middle School
 Wright City West Elementary School
 Wright Start Preschool

Foristell
 Wright City East Elementary School

References

School districts in Missouri
School districts established in 1922
1922 establishments in Missouri